Guizhou Aircraft Industry Corporation (GAIC) or Guizhou Aviation Aircraft Co Ltd (GAC) is a Chinese aircraft manufacturer and military aircraft based in Guiyang, Guizhou. It is a subsidiary of the Aviation Industry Corporation of China (AVIC). The company's core products include trainers, turbojets, UAVs, missiles and launchers. Within a joint venture with Subaru named Yunque, they've also built Chinese license versions of cars like Subaru Rex and Subaru Vivio.

Products

Trainers
Guizhou JL-9
FTC2000 Mountain Eagle 2-seat trainer - based on JJ-7 / MIG-21U fighter trainer

Fighters
Guizhou JJ-7
 original developer - upgraded version of the original MiG-21

Unmanned aerial vehicles
WZ-2000
multipurpose unmanned aerial vehicle
Soar Dragon
Harrier Hawk

Turbofan jet engine
Guizhou WS-13
 Major application: JF-17 light weight fighter and J-31 stealth fighter.

See also
 Aviation Industry Corporation of China (AVIC)
 ACAC consortium
 Changhe Aircraft Industries Corporation
 Chengdu Aircraft Industry Group
 Harbin Aircraft Industry Group
 Hongdu Aviation Industry Corporation
 Shaanxi Aircraft Corporation
 Shanghai Aviation Industrial Company
 Shenyang Aircraft Corporation
 Xi'an Aircraft Industrial Corporation

References

External links
 Guizhou Aviation Industry Import/Export Company website 

Aircraft manufacturers of China
Aircraft engine manufacturers of China
Gas turbine manufacturers
Defence companies of the People's Republic of China
Companies with year of establishment missing
Companies based in Guizhou